Åsa Monica Sigurdsdotter Bjerkerot (born 12 May 1959, Bandhagen, Vantörs parish), is a Swedish actor, comedian, writer and film director. She has, among other things, been Annika's voice in the radio serial Tordyveln flyger i skymningen and Minnie Mouse's Swedish voice.

Selected filmography
 Tuppen (1981)
 Charlie Strapp and Froggy Ball Flying High (Kalle Stropp och Grodan Boll på svindlande äventyr) (1991) (Voice of  The Princess Cone Green)

External links

References 

1959 births
Living people
Actresses from Stockholm
Swedish comedians
Swedish film directors
Swedish women film directors
Sommar (radio program) hosts
Best Supporting Actor Guldbagge Award winners